Youxia, officially Youxia Motors, is a Chinese automobile manufacturer headquartered in Shanghai, China, that specializes in producing neighborhood electric vehicles, low-speed electric vehicles, and sport electric vehicles.

History
Youxia was founded in 2014, with a registered capital of 4.2 billion yuan. In October 2017, Youxia launched their factory construction, a completed their automated production line design.

The Youxia X, also called the Youxia Ranger, is their first production vehicle. It has RWD, a 40 kWh battery, and can go 2.8 seconds to go 0–60 km. It includes a programmable face displayer as well as driver set features. The X includes Youxia OS, a smart-technology system that can control air conditioning, lights, voice recognition and commands, as well as talk back to the driver. The car has a 70% accident avoidance. It will have up to Level 3 self-driving capabilities. It was designed by 50 engineers in 500 days. It will cost $30,000 and $45,000.

Vehicles

Models
Youxia currently has 1 production vehicle.

Concept Models

See also
Tesla
Tesla Model S
WindBooster
Thunder Power

References

Electric vehicle manufacturers of China
Car brands
Car manufacturers of China
Chinese brands